Alfred James (Fred) Murdoch (18 April 1877 – 1 June 1960) was a New Zealand politician, first as an Independent Liberal then of the United Party, and from 1943 the National Party. He was Minister of Agriculture and Minister of Mines from 1930 to 1931 in the United Government of New Zealand.

Biography

Early life
Murdoch was born in 1877 in Onehunga. He trained as a school teacher and taught at Onehunga, Northcote, Hikurangi, Mata, and Ruataka. He retired from teaching in 1919 and became a farmer, breeding Jersey cattle. For a time, he was the chairman of the New Zealand Dairy Board, and he belonged to the Chamber of Commerce in Whangarei.

Political career

Murdoch was Minister of Agriculture, and Minister of Mines, in the United Government under George Forbes from May 1930 to September 1931.

In early 1954 the 77 year-old Murdoch was challenged for the National nomination by William Rodney Lewin Vallance, the deputy mayor of Whangarei. Vallance won a postal ballot of members, an outcome which split the Marsden National Party into two feuding factions. After it emerged that Vallance was in trouble with his taxes he was in turn deselected and replaced by Don McKay, the chairman of the Marsden electorate committee. Vallance ran as an independent candidate and split the vote, almost costing National the seat. Murdoch was only the second sitting National MP to not win reselection.

Murdoch died in 1960.

Notes

References

|-

|-

1877 births
1960 deaths
New Zealand National Party MPs
Members of the Cabinet of New Zealand
United Party (New Zealand) MPs
Independent MPs of New Zealand
Unsuccessful candidates in the 1919 New Zealand general election
Unsuccessful candidates in the 1925 New Zealand general election
Unsuccessful candidates in the 1938 New Zealand general election
Unsuccessful candidates in the 1935 New Zealand general election
Members of the New Zealand House of Representatives
New Zealand MPs for North Island electorates